McCleary is an Irish surname. It originated in Galway, Ireland, but the surname is primarily now found in Ulster and Scotland with many descendants in Ulster Scots and Irish  areas of North America.

The name McCleary is derived from the Gaelic Mac Cléirigh which means Son of the Cleric (or Son of the Priest).

The earliest derivation of the name is possibly Mael Fabhaill mac Cleireach, ancestor of the Ó hEidhin/Hynes family of County Galway, fl. 800.

However, many surnames such as Clarke and MacTaggart also derive from son of the cleric or son of the priest. Orphans were often taken in by the local religious orders, and indeed priests fathered children before the adoption of celibacy, which may be the source of variations of this surname.

List of persons with the surname
Andrew McCleary (1863–1944), Canadian politician
Boyd McCleary (born 1949), British diplomat, governor of the British Virgin Islands
Brian Verdon McCleary (1897–1978), New Zealand rugby player
Christopher R. McCleary (born 1956), American venture capitalist
Ernie McCleary (1923–2012), Northern Irish footballer
Garath McCleary (born 1987), Jamaican professional Association footballer
George W. McCleary (1807–1873), American politician
James McCleary (1853–1924), United States Representative from Minnesota
Mary McCleary (born 1951), American artist
Rachel McCleary, American academic
Tracy McCleary (died 2003), American jazz band leader
Trent McCleary (born 1972), Canadian former professional hockey player
Urie McCleary (1905–1980), American art director and designer in Hollywood
William McCleary (1853–1917), Canadian merchant and politician

Places
McCleary, Washington, United States
McCleary Glacier, Antarctica

See also
McCleary Elementary School, Pittsburgh, Pennsylvania
McCleery
McClary
Cleary (surname)
Clary (disambiguation)

References

 Clerical Households in Late Medieval Italy, Roisin Cossar, Harvard University Press, 2017.

Irish families
Surnames of Irish origin
Surnames of British Isles origin
Anglicised Scottish Gaelic-language surnames